Flavia Pennetta won in the final 6–4, 5–4, after Klára Zakopalová retired due to a left ankle injury.

Seeds

Draw

Finals

Top half

Bottom half

Qualifying

Seeds

Qualifiers

Qualifying draw

First qualifier

Second qualifier

Third qualifier

Fourth qualifier

External links 
 Main and Qualifying Draws

Cachantun Cup - Singles